Zbrojníky is a village and municipality in the Levice District in the Nitra Region of Slovakia.

History
In historical records the village was first mentioned in 1303.

Geography
The village lies at an altitude of 148 metres and covers an area of 16.36 km². It has a population of about 490 people.

Ethnicity
The village is about 68% Slovak and 32% Magyar.

Facilities
The village has a public library and football pitch.

Notable people
Lajos Evva (1851–1912), Hungarian theater director, writer, and translator.

External links
https://web.archive.org/web/20071116010355/http://www.statistics.sk/mosmis/eng/run.html

Villages and municipalities in Levice District